Bedous is a commune of the Pyrénées-Atlantiques department in southwestern France. It is the birthplace of Pierre Laclède, the Frenchman who founded the U.S. city of St. Louis.

Its station on the Pau–Canfranc railway was closed after an accident in 1970, but re-opened in 2016 as the terminus of service from Pau.

See also
Communes of the Pyrénées-Atlantiques department

References

Communes of Pyrénées-Atlantiques
Pyrénées-Atlantiques communes articles needing translation from French Wikipedia